Agapanthia frivaldszkyi is a species of beetle in the subfamily Lamiinae, found in Syria and Turkey.

References

frivaldszkyi
Beetles described in 1884
Beetles of Asia